This is a complete list of ice hockey players who were drafted in the National Hockey League Entry Draft by the Hartford Whalers franchise. It includes every player who was drafted, regardless of whether they played for the team.

Key
 Played at least one game with the Whalers
 Spent entire NHL career with the Whalers
() Inducted into the Hockey Hall of Fame

Draft picks

WHA
Statistics show each player's career regular season totals in the WHA.

NHL

See also
List of Hartford Whalers players
1979 NHL Expansion Draft
List of Carolina Hurricanes draft picks

References

 
 
 
 
 

draft picks
 
 
Hartford Whalers